Thuận Thành is a district-level town (thị xã) of Bắc Ninh province in the Red River Delta region of Vietnam. As of 2022 the town had a population of 199,577. The district covers an area of 117.83 km². The town seat lies at Hồ.

Administrative subdivisions 
The district is administratively divided into Hồ town and 19 rural communes (xã): An Bình, Đại Đồng Thành, Đình Tổ, Gia Đông, Hà Mãn, Hoài Thượng, Mão Điền, Nghĩa Đạo, Ngũ Thái, Nguyệt Đức, Ninh Xá, Song Hồ, Song Liễu, Thanh Khương, Trạm Lộ, Trí Quả and Xuân Lâm.

Culture

Kinh Dương Vương is the first king of the Vietnamese people, and was the father of Lạc Long Quân.
Đông Hồ painting is a genre of Vietnamese woodcut paintings originating from Đông Hồ village (làng Đông Hồ).
Luy Lâu was the ancient capital of Vietnam after it became a Han Dynasty Chinese province called Jiaozhou, or Jiaozhi under the Chinese Commander-in-chief Shi Xie.
Dâu Pagoda was built between AD 187 and 226. The pagoda is in the area of the remains of the ancient citadel and Buddhist center of Luy Lâu.
Bút Tháp Temple is one of the most famous pagodas in Vietnam. Inside, there are various valuable ancient objects and statues, which are considered to be Vietnamese masterpieces of 17th century wood carving.
Thuận Thành No 1 High School is one of the top-ranked high schools in Bắc Ninh Province and which was in Vietnam's Top 100 High Schools for many years.

Notable people
Hoàng Cầm
Nguyễn Gia Thiều

Gallery

References

Districts of Bắc Ninh province